South Coast Conference may refer to:

 South Coast Conference (CCCAA), a collegiate athletic conference in California
 South Coast Conference (MIAA), a high school athletic conference in the Massachusetts Interscholastic Athletic Association